James J. Kerasiotes was the director of the Massachusetts Turnpike Authority and the project manager of the Big Dig in Boston during the 1990s.  He was asked to resign by Massachusetts governor Paul Celucci on April 11, 2000, because of cost overruns. The Big Dig has continued to suffer cost overruns and other setbacks since then. He also served as Secretary of Transportation in the Cabinet of Governors William Weld and Paul Celluci from 1992 to 1998.

Before entering state government, Kerasiotes was publisher of NewsWest, a suburban newspaper in eastern Massachusetts, and later a director of Tab Communications, a chain of weekly newspapers west of Boston. He also was involved in the creation of the monster board.

In July 2014, Kerasiotes was charged in federal court with filing false personal income tax returns. He pleaded guilty on September 11, 2014, before Judge William G. Young and was sentenced to 6 months in prison.

References

Massachusetts Secretaries of Transportation
Transportation in Massachusetts
Year of birth missing (living people)
Living people